Partial monosomy of chromosome 13q is a monosomy that results from the loss of all or part of the long arm of chromosome 13 in human beings. It is a rare genetic disorder which results in severe congenital abnormalities which are frequently fatal at an early age. Up until 2003, more than 125 cases had been documented in medical literature.

Symptoms and signs
Symptoms vary from case to case, and may correlate to how much of the chromosome is missing. Symptoms that are frequently observed with the condition include:
 Low birth weight
 Malformations of the head
 Eye abnormalities
 Defects of the hands and feet, polydactyly
 Reproductive abnormalities (males)
 Psychological and motor retardation

Diagnosis

Treatment

References

Genetic disorders with no OMIM